Mullsjö is a locality and the seat of Mullsjö Municipality, Jönköping County, Sweden with 5,452 inhabitants in 2010. Elevation: 286 metres.

References 

 
Municipal seats of Jönköping County
Swedish municipal seats
Populated places in Mullsjö Municipality